Zemzemi is a surname. Notable people with the surname include:

Moataz Zemzemi (born 1999), Tunisian footballer
Moez Zemzemi (born 1975), Tunisian boxer
Mohamed Zemzemi (born 1991), Tunisian athlete

See also
Zemzem (name)